Merry Men 2: Another Mission is a 2019 Nigerian crime action comedy film and a sequel to Merry Men: The Real Yoruba Demons. It stars Ramsey Nouah, Ayo Makun, Jim Iyke, Falz, Ireti Doyle, Damilola Adegbite, Ufuoma McDermott, Rosaline Meurer, Nancy Isime, Alex Asogwa and Linda Osifo.

Cast 
 Ramsey Nouah as Ayo Alesinloye
 Ayo Makun as Amaju Abioritsegbemi
 Jim Iyke as Naz Okigbo
 Folarin "Falz" Falana as Remi Martins
 Ufuoma McDermott as Zara Aminu
 Damilola Adegbite as Dera Chukwu
 Ireti Doyle as Dame Bethany Maduka
 Rosaline Meurer as Kemi Alesinloye
 Nancy Isime as Sophie Obaseki
 Williams Uchemba as Johnny
 Linda Osifo as Hassana
 Alex Asogwa as Calypso
 Regina Daniels as Kenya Obi
 Ejike Asiegbu as Francis Uduak
 Olamide as himself

Reception 
According to a review by Nollywood Post, "Merry Men 2 is gifted with a more fluid story line and better-connected scenes, thanks to its new writer. We actually knew what was going on. The Real Yoruba Demons made us look around in desperation several times, but Another Mission had us nodding and smiling."

References

External links
 
 

2019 films
2019 crime action films
2019 action comedy films
2010s crime comedy films
Nigerian action comedy films
Nigerian crime comedy films
Films set in Abuja
Films shot in Abuja
Yoruba-language films
Films about politicians
Films about corruption
Films set in Lagos
Films shot in Lagos
Nonlinear narrative films
Films about kidnapping